The Ballad of the Brown King is a cantata composed by Margaret Bonds. It may be her most frequently performed work. It was written in honor of the African king, Balthazar, with text written by Langston Hughes for Bonds.  The Ballad premiered in December 1954 in New York and was performed by the George McClain Choir. This was a shorter version of the piece, which was subsequently expanded by both Hughes and Bonds to include full orchestration. The longer version was performed on December 11, 1960 and televised in a CBS special called "Christmas U.S.A." The 1960 performance was sung by the Westminster Choir.

A new orchestration of the piece by conductor Malcolm J. Merriweather was recorded in 2018 by the Dessoff Choirs and released on November 1, 2019. Margaret Bonds's original orchestration is unpublished and has never been recorded. 

The cantata is made up of nine movements with parts for soprano, tenor, baritone and choir. The composition includes "a combination of European, Jazz and Calypso music." Other musical influences include four-part hymn and gospel music. There are also "quasi-recitative sections" and blues influenced parts of the cantata.

Ballad focuses on one of the Three Kings from the story of the birth of Jesus. Hughes chose the African king, Balthazar, as a way to "reinforce the image of African participation in the Nativity story."

References

External links 
 Oh, Sing of the King Who Was Tall and Brown (2010 video)
 Front cover of printed score for S.A.T.B. Chorus

Christmas music
Works by Langston Hughes
1954 compositions
1960 compositions
Cantatas
Cultural depictions of the Biblical Magi
Songs about kings
Epiphany music